This is a list of player transfers involving RFU Championship teams before or during the 2021–22 season. The list is of deals that are confirmed and are either from or to a rugby union team in the Championship during the 2020–21 season. It is not unknown for confirmed deals to be cancelled at a later date. On 25 April 2022, Caldy won the National League 1 competition to be promoted into the RFU Championship from the 2022-23 season, with no team relegated to National League 1. No clubs were promoted to the Gallagher Premiership for the 2022-23 season.

Ampthill

Players In
 Syd Blackmore from  Cornish Pirates
 Jake Elwood from  London Scottish
 Dom Hardman from  Waikato
 Matt Gallagher from  Sedgley Park
 Joe Sproston from  Dijon
 Griff Phillipson from  Loughborough Students
 Caleb Montgomery from  Worcester Warriors 
 Morgan Strong from  Ospreys
 Harry Wilson from  London Scottish
 Charlie Gowling from  Richmond 
 Sam Hanks from  London Scottish
 Tom Hardwick from  Albi
 Gwyn Parks from  Swansea University
 Conor Rankin from  Ulster
 Pete White from  Coventry
 Tom Bacon from  Wasps
 Beck Cutting from  Worcester Warriors 
 Rob Hardwick from  Wasps
 James Tunney from  Wasps
 Fyn Brown from  Wasps

Players Out
 Jamie Jack to  Edinburgh
 Jac Arthur to  Bedford Blues
 Russell Bennett to  Jersey Reds
 Jack Dickinson to  Nottingham
 Joe-Luca Smith to  Rosslyn Park 
 Matt Wilkinson to  London Scottish 
 Billy Harding to  Rosslyn Park

Bedford Blues

Players In
 Jac Arthur from  Ampthill 
 Charlie Ryland from  Cardiff Metropolitan University 
 Michael Le Bourgeois from  Wasps 
 Monty Royston from  Durham University 
 Seán French from  Munster
 Lewis Holsey from  Worcester Warriors
 Kieran Curran from  Wasps

Players Out
 Richard Lane to  Bristol Bears 
 Will Biggs to  Coventry 
 Bailey Ransom released 
 Andre Robson released
 Ollie Stedman to  Birmingham Moseley
 Josh Pieterse to  Chinnor

Caldy

Players In
 Dan Bibby from  England Sevens 
 Louis Beer from  Cambridge

Players Out
 Lucas Titherington to  Coventry

Cornish Pirates

Players In
 Will Crane from  Hartpury University 
 Morgan Nelson from  Cardiff Metropolitan University 
 Steele Barker from  Redruth 
 Olly White from  University of Exeter 
 Will Tredwin from  Redruth 
 Garyn Smith from  Cardiff
 Alex Everett from  Cardiff RFC 
 Will Britton from  Gloucester 
 Olly Adkins from  Gloucester (season-long loan) 
 James Fender from  Ospreys (season-long loan) 
 Josh Williams unattached 
 Seb Nagle-Taylor from  Gloucester 
 Harvey Beaton from  Saracens (season-long loan)
 Jarrad Hayler from  Royal Navy

Players Out
 Tom Channon retired 
 Danny Cutmore to  Ealing Trailfinders 
 Nicolas de Battista retired 
 Callum Patterson retired 
 Sam Rodman to  Hartpury University 
 Tom Duncan retired 
 Matt Bolwell to  Rosslyn Park 
 Josh Caulfield to  London Irish
 Ed Scragg to  London Irish
 Alex O'Meara to  Richmond
 Syd Blackmore to  Ampthill
 Antonio Kiri Kiri to  Maidenhead

Coventry

Players In
 Will Talbot-Davies from  Dragons
 Harry Seward from  Ealing Trailfinders 
 Will Biggs from  Bedford Blues
 Ollie Andrews from  Cardiff Metropolitan University 
 Jordon Poole from  Exeter Chiefs 
 Lucas Titherington from  Caldy 
 Patrick Pellegrini from  Sevenoaks 
 Marjin Huis from  Durham University 
 Will Rigg from  Cardiff Metropolitan University 
 Will Wand from  Cambridge 
 Will Lane from  Jersey Reds 
 Shea Cornish from  Exeter Chiefs (season-long loan) 
 Danny Southworth from  Exeter Chiefs (season-long loan)
 George Smith from  Old Redcliffians
 Will Chudley from  Worcester Warriors 
 Tom Dodd from  Worcester Warriors

Players Out
 Phil Boulton released 
 Nile Dacres released
 Tony Fenner released
 Andy Forsyth released
 Luc Jeannot released
 Rob Stevenson released
 Ryan Burrows retired 
 Josh Barton to  Newcastle Falcons 
 Rob Knox to  Birmingham Moseley
 Will Owen to  Clifton 
 Pete White to  Ampthill
 Tom Emery to  Henley Hawks

Doncaster Knights

Players In
 Karl Garside from  Northampton Saints 
 Jared Cardew from  Richmond 
 Will Yarnell from  University of Exeter 
 George Simpson from  Hartpury University
 Robbie Smith from  Hartpury University 
 Ehize Ehizode from  London Scottish 
 Mak Wilson from  Harlequins
 Sam Daly from  Watsonians
 Maurice Nwakor from  London Scottish 
 Martin Segren from  Selknam 
 Kai Owen from  Worcester Warriors 
 Jake Armstrong from  Bristol Bears
 Theo Vukašinović from  Wasps 
 Jack Metcalf from  Ealing Trailfinders

Players Out
 Sam Graham to  Northampton Saints
 Guido Volpi to  Zebre Parma 
 Danny Drake to  North Harbour   
 Josh Peters to  Newcastle Falcons
 Gareth Denman retired 
 Jack Davies to  Hartpury University 
 Liam Usher released 
 Lloyd Wheeldon released
 Kyle Evans to  Wakefield Trinity 
 Mark Best to  Ballynahinch 
 Charlie Connolly to  Chinnor

Ealing Trailfinders

Players In
 Ollie Fox from  Bath
 Danny Cutmore from  Cornish Pirates
 Kevin O'Byrne from  Munster
 Dan Lancaster unattached 
 Ross Kane from  Ulster 
 Ollie Newman from  Northampton Saints
 Carlo Tizzano from  NSW Waratahs
 David Douglas-Bridge from  Loughborough Students 
 Jonah Holmes from  Dragons
 Rob Farrar from  Newcastle Falcons
 Will Montgomery from  Newcastle Falcons
 Josh Gillespie from  Northampton Saints
 David O'Connor from  Ulster 
 Peter Robb from  Connacht 
 Jack Metcalf from  Sale Sharks
 Jack Grant from  NSW Waratahs
 Eparama Rokodrava from  Wasps
 Nathan Earle from  Newcastle Falcons 
 Rhys Anstey from  Cardiff
 Andrew Davidson from  Gloucester

Players Out
 Harry Seward to  Coventry
 James Cannon released 
 Matt Gordon to  Rosslyn Park 
 Charlie Walker to  Rosslyn Park 
 Harry Hunter to  Richmond
 Bill Johnston to  Richmond
 Stephen Kerins to  Richmond
 Taine Wagstaff to  Rosslyn Park 
 Gary Porter to  Stormers 
 Elliot Chivers to  London Scottish (season-long loan) 
 Len Massyn to  Blagnac 
 Shane Buckley to  Highfield 
 Tadgh McElroy to  Leinster 
 Jack Metcalf to  Doncaster Knights

Hartpury University

Players In
 Sam Rodman from  Cornish Pirates
 Jack Davies from  Doncaster Knights
 Harry Fry from  Dragons
 Alex Forrester from  Clifton

Players Out
 James Williams to  Bristol Bears
 Will Crane to  Cornish Pirates
 George Simpson to  Doncaster Knights
 Robbie Smith to  Doncaster Knights
 Jono Benz-Salomon to  Bristol Bears 
 Toti Benz-Salomon to  Bristol Bears
 Oscar Lennon to  Bristol Bears
 Shaun Knight to  Cinderford
 Aled Ward to  Pontypridd 
 Oli Robinson to  Rosslyn Park 
 Conor Maguire to  Richmond

Jersey Reds

Players In
 Sam Grahamslaw from  Edinburgh 
 James Hadfield from  Richmond
 Tomi Lewis from  Scarlets
 Monty Weatherby from  Sandbach
 Ben Woollett from  Warringah
 Hamish Bain from  Glasgow Warriors 
 James Dun from  Bristol Bears (season-long loan)
 Charlie Powell from  Bristol Bears (season-long loan)
 Ethan Rault from  Scarlets
 James Scott from  Worcester Warriors
 Russell Bennett from  Ampthill 
 Josh Gray from  Gloucester (season-long loan)
 Jonny Law from  Leicester Tigers
 Alex McHenry from  Munster
 Toby Venner from  Gloucester
 Greg McGrath from  Connacht
 Ben Burnell from  Cardiff

Players Out
 Wesley White to  Bath 
 Jack Higgins released 
 Guy Thompson retired
 Sam Leeming released 
 Ryan Olowofela released
 Jack Roberts released
 Harry Simmons returned to  Leicester Tigers
 Will Lane to  Coventry
 Alex Humfrey to  Rosslyn Park 
 James Flynn to  Saracens 
 Max Ayling to  Sale FC 
 Roy Godfrey to  Jersey Athletic 
 Jack Macfarlane to  Jersey Athletic

London Scottish

Players In
 Zach Clow from  RGC 1404 
 Sam Smith from  Leeds Beckett University 
 Dan Cuthbert from  Loughborough Students 
 Matt Wilkinson from  Ampthill 
 Nathan Chamberlain from  Edinburgh 
 Robbie McCallum from  Glasgow Warriors 
 Theo Manihera from  Nottingham 
 Luca Petrozzi from  Benetton 
 Harry Hill from  Northumbria University 
 Elliot Chivers from  Ealing Trailfinders (season-long loan) 
 Austin Wallis from  Loughborough Students 
 Cameron Anderson from  Wasps

Players Out
 Tom Petty to  Plymouth Albion 
 Ehize Ehizode to  Doncaster Knights
 Jake Elwood to  Ampthill
 Maurice Nwakor to  Doncaster Knights
 Harry Wilson to  Ampthill
 Sam Hanks to  Ampthill

Nottingham

Players In
 Ross Bundy from  Rennes 
 Harry Clayton from  Newcastle University
 Jack Dickinson from  Ampthill
 Michael Green from  Hong Kong Scottish
 Iosefa Maloney-Fiola from  Bay of Plenty
 Jack Neville from  Hong Kong Sevens
 Javiah Pohe from  South Leicester
 Liam Slatem from  Hong Kong Scottish
 Xavier Valentine from  Leeds Tykes
 Jordan Olowofela from  Leicester Tigers

Players Out
 Jose Andrade released 
 Liam Bishop released
 Jake Farnworth released
 Jack Ramshaw released
 Storm Hanekom to  Newport (Salop) 
 Matt Marsh to  Birmingham Moseley 
 Elliot Creed to  Birmingham Moseley
 Josh McNulty to  Chinnor 
 Elliot Bale to  Dijon 
 Theo Manihera to  London Scottish

Richmond

Players In
 Tom Caesar from  Ulster 
 Paddy Case from  Leeds Tykes
 George Cave from  University of Bath
 Harry Hunter from  Ealing Trailfinders
 Bill Johnston from  Ealing Trailfinders
 Stephen Kerins from  Ealing Trailfinders
 Conor Maguire from  Hartpury University
 Bailey Marshall-Telfer from  Cardiff Metropolitan University
 Tom Mills from  Saracens
 Alex O'Meara from  Cornish Pirates
 Ayanfe Oladukun from  University of Bristol
 Raz Patel from  University of Bath
 Alex Post from  Oxford University
 Freddie Owsley from  Edinburgh

Players Out
 Jared Cardew to  Doncaster Knights
 James Hadfield to  Jersey Reds
 Luc Jones to  Rosslyn Park 
 Jack Rouse to  Esher 
 Fred Hoskins to  Rosslyn Park 
 Max Trimble to  Rosslyn Park 
 Charlie Gowling to  Ampthill

See also
List of 2022–23 Premiership Rugby transfers
List of 2022–23 United Rugby Championship transfers
List of 2022–23 Super Rugby transfers
List of 2022–23 Top 14 transfers
List of 2022–23 Rugby Pro D2 transfers
List of 2022–23 Major League Rugby transfers

References

2022-23
2022–23 RFU Championship